The Grammy Award for Best Soul Gospel Performance, Traditional was awarded from 1978 to 1983.  A similar award, the Grammy Award for Best Traditional Soul Gospel Album has been awarded since 1991.  

Years reflect the year in which the Grammy Awards were presented, for works released in the previous year.

Recipients

References

Grammy Awards for gospel music